A Line in the Sand is a two-part British television mini-series, adapted by Gerald Seymour from his 1999 novel of the same name, that first broadcast on ITV on 7 June 2004. The series, directed by James Hawes, stars Ross Kemp as Frank Parry, a former MI6 spy who tries to escape his past by hiding out in a remote village on the Suffolk coast. The series was originally scheduled for broadcast in September 2001, but was later shelved until June 2004, due to a major plotline which involved Middle-Eastern terrorists, which was deemed to be too sensitive following the 9/11 terror attacks in the United States earlier that month.

For some international broadcasts, the series was broadcast as one feature-length film. In the United States, the series aired two years prior to the UK premiere, airing on 18 June 2002. The series was released on DVD via ITV Studios on 15 January 2007. The series is notable for featuring a very early role for Danny Mac, before his casting as Dodger Savage in Hollyoaks.

Plot
In a remote village on the Suffolk coast, Frank Parry (Ross Kemp) waits for his past to catch up with him. A former spy for MI6, Perry was based in Iran watching their chemical and biological weapons programme, but he decides to go straight, giving up the names of his high-level Middle-Eastern contacts in exchange for immunity from the government. The information he brought back led to the deaths of many Iranian scientists and seriously undermined the progress of the weapons programme. When his old business partners catch wind of the situation, they want revenge. Now Iran has dispatched its most deadly assassin to complete the task. Code-named 'The Anvil', he will find Perry, unless Perry's protector's can reach him first.

Critical reception
Robert Pardi of TV Guide said of the series; "Engrossing in a middlebrow sort of way, this straightforward thriller, originally broadcast on British television in 2001, confirms one's worst suspicions about the heartlessness of all governments. Screenwriter Gerald Seymour gets a little too wrapped up in the mechanics of the espionage plot to lend the hero's plight much suspense, but the timely subject matter does add extra heft to a film that's caught somewhere between provocative political melodrama and standard action bash."

Many also noted at the time of broadcast that Kemp's character in the series was very similar to that of his Ultimate Force character Henry "Henno" Garvie. Kemp later revealed that it was his performance in A Line in the Sand which earned him the part of Henno.

Cast
 Ross Kemp as Gavin Hughes/Frank Parry; former MI6
 Saskia Reeves as Meryl Rodgers, Gavin's girlfriend
 Mark Bazeley as DI Geoff Markham; Gavin's liaison agent
 Vincent Franklin as Sammy Cargill; one of Gavin's former associates
 Ralph Ineson as DS Bill Davies; Markham's sidekick
 James Puddephatt as PC Dave Rankin; one of Gavin's guards
 Sean McKenzie as PC Joe Paget; another of Gavin's guards
 Katy Cavanagh as Leanne Mitchell; Gavin's ex-girlfriend
 Kayvan Novak as Vahid "The Anvil"; a marksman sent to kill Gavin
 Danny Mac as Tom Westwick (Aged 10)
 Jake Greene as Tom Westwick

Episodes

References

External links

ITV television dramas
2004 British television series debuts
2004 British television series endings
2000s British television miniseries
Television shows based on British novels
Television series by ITV Studios
Television shows produced by Anglia Television
English-language television shows